Clunes or Clune's may refer to:

Places 
 Clunes, Victoria, Australia
 Electoral district of Clunes and Allandale, representing Clunes in the Victorian Legislative Assembly
 Shire of Talbot and Clunes, former local government area including Clunes
 Clunes railway station, Victoria
 Clunes, New South Wales, Australia
 Clunes, Lochaber, Scotland
 Clunes railway station (Scotland), former station north of Kirkhill
 Clune's Auditorium, former name of Hazard's Pavilion, a defunct auditorium in Los Angeles

People 
Alec Clunes (1912–1970), English actor and theatrical manager
Anna Clunes, British diplomat
Martin Clunes (born 1961), British actor
Martin Clunes: Islands of Australia, an Australian documentary series hosted by Martin Clunes
Archibald Clunes Innes (1799–1857), Scottish soldier
Alexander Clunes Sheriff (1816–1878), British politician

Other uses 
Jackie Clunes, character in British television series Hotel Babylon
Clunes Football Netball Club, athletics organization in Clunes, Victoria

See also
 Clune (disambiguation)